Puka Qaqa (Quechua puka red, qaqa rock, "red rock", Hispanicized spelling Pucaccacca)  is a mountain south of the Wallanka mountain range in the Andes of Peru which reaches an altitude of approximately . It is located in the Ancash Region, Bolognesi Province, Huasta District. Puka Qaqa lies at the Pampa Wayi valley, southwest of a lake named Kunturqucha ("condor lake").

References 

Mountains of Peru
Mountains of Ancash Region